Viktor Bauer (15 September 1915 – 13 December 1969) was a former Luftwaffe fighter ace and recipient of the Knight's Cross of the Iron Cross with Oak Leaves during World War II. A flying ace or fighter ace is a military aviator credited with shooting down five or more enemy aircraft during aerial combat. Bauer is credited with 106 aerial victories, achieved in over 400 combat missions, all but four claimed on the Eastern Front.

Early life and career
Bauer was born on 19 September 1915 in Löcknitz, the son of a landowner. He joined the military service on 1 April 1935, initially serving in Infanterie-Regiment 1 (1st Infantry Regiment). He served in the Reichsarbeitsdienst (Reich Labour Service) from 1 January 1936 until 31 March 1936.  He transferred to the Luftwaffe of the Nazi Germany on 6 April 1936 as a Fahnenjunker (cadet). Bauer completed his flight training on 1 March 1938. That day, he was also promoted to Leutnant (second lieutenant) and transferred to Kampfgeschwader 138 (KG 138–138th Bomber Wing). On 1 May 1938, he attended a Jagdfliegerschule (fighter pilot school). On 1 July 1938, Bauer was assigned to the VI. Gruppe (4th group) of Jagdgeschwader 132 "Richthofen" (JG 132–132nd Fighter Wing) as a fighter pilot. On 9 March 1939, he was posted to I. Gruppe (1st group) of Jagdgeschwader 331 (JG 331–331st Fighter Wing) and to I. Gruppe  of Jagdgeschwader 77 (JG 77–77th Fighter Wing) on 31 July 1939.

World War II
World War II in Europe had begun on Friday, 1 September 1939, when German forces invaded Poland. On 1 November, he received the Iron Cross 2nd Class.
On 1 March 1940, he was transferred to the 2./Jagdgeschwader 77 (JG 77–77th Fighter Wing). Bauer claimed his first aerial victory on 15 May 1940 west of Bruges, a Royal Air Force (RAF) Hawker Hurricane. He shot down another Hurricane near Cambrai on 18 May.
Bauer was promoted to Oberleutnant (first lieutenant) on 1 June 1940 and was awarded the Iron Cross 1st Class on 18 November 1940. He then fought in the Battle of Britain against the RAF, claiming a Supermarine Spitfire shot down on 1 November 1940. Bauer was awarded the Iron Cross 1st Class on 18 November 1940, and then transferred to Jagdgeschwader 3 (JG 3–3rd Fighter Wing) in December 1940. On 10 June 1941, Bauer was appointed Staffelkapitän (squadron leader) of 9. Staffel (9th squadron) of JG 3, succeeding Oberleutnant Max Jaczak who killed in a flying accident the day before.

Eastern Front
In preparation for the German invasion of the Soviet Union, Operation Barbarossa, he and his JG 3 were transferred to the Eastern Front. In June 1941, he claimed 15 Soviet aircraft shot down, including five SB-2 twin-engine bombers claimed on 26 June alone. He then claimed 17 victories in July, including five Russian DB-3 twin-engine bombers on 12 July.

On 23 July 1941, Bauer claimed two Polikarpov I-153 biplane fighters shot down, taking his to total to 36 aerial victories. That afternoon, his Messerschmitt Bf 109 F-2 (Werknummer 8987—factory number) sustained heavy damage in combat with a flight of Ilyushin DB-3 bombers at the Dnieper. Bauer attempted a forced landing at Bila Tserkva, the aircraft somersaulted, resulting in heavy injuries to Bauer. During his convalescence, he was awarded the Knight's Cross of the Iron Cross on 30 July 1941 for 34 aerial victories. During his absence, Leutnant Helmut Mertens served as acting Staffelkapitän of 9. Staffel. Bauer returned to his unit in February 1942.

At the time of his return to front line service, III. Gruppe of JG 3 had been redeployed to an area of operations north of Lake Ilmen in support of the airlift resupplying German forces in the Demyansk Pocket. There, on 18 February 1942, Bauer claimed two Mikoyan-Gurevich MiG-3 fighter aircraft, taking his total to 40 aerial victories. In combat with 6 Udarnaya Aviatsionnaya Gruppa (6 UAG—6th Soviet Strike Aviation Group) on 4 April, he claimed his 50th aerial victory, a Lavochkin-Gorbunov-Gudkov LaGG-3 fighter. On 19 May, Bauer claimed a 429 Istrebitel'nyy Aviatsionyy Polk (429 IAP—429th Fighter Aviation Regiment) MiG-3. On 22 June 1942, Bauer was awarded the Honorary Cup of the Luftwaffe.

One year later on 26 July 1942, he received the Knight's Cross of the Iron Cross with Oak Leaves for 102 aerial victories. He was the 14th Luftwaffe pilot to achieve the century mark. Bauer and together with Oberleutnant Erwin Clausen were presented the Oak Leaves by Adolf Hitler at the Führerhauptquartier at Rastenburg.

On 9 August, he claimed his 106th victory. On 10 August 1942, Bauer force landed his Bf 109 F-4 (Werknummer 13241—factory number) at Nowy-Kalach. His aircraft had been damaged by enemy return fire and Bauer was again wounded, forcing him to surrender command of 9. Staffel to Leutnant Rolf Diergardt. On 1 September 1942, he was promoted to Hauptmann (captain).

Training commands
On recovery, Bauer was put in command of  Ergänzungs-Jagdgruppe Ost (Supplementary Fighter Group, East) in southern France on 9 August 1943. In this command position, he was promoted to Major (major) on 1 May 1944. Promoted to Oberstleutnant (lieutenant colonel) and later to Oberst (colonel), Bauer was appointed Geschwaderkommodore (wing commander) of Ergänzungs-Jagdgeschwader 1 (EJG 1–1st Supplementary Fighter Wing) until the end of hostilities in May 1945. He was taken prisoner of war and released in July 1945.

Later life
Bauer died on 13 December 1969 in Bad Homburg.

Summary of career

Aerial victory claims
According to US historian David T. Zabecki, Bauer was credited with 106 aerial victories. Spick also lists Bauer with 106 aerial victories with one unconfirmed victory in over 400 combat missions, all but four claimed on the Eastern Front. Mathews and Foreman, authors of Luftwaffe Aces – Biographies and Victory Claims, researched the German Federal Archives and found records for 104 aerial victory claims, plus four further unconfirmed claim. This number omits claim number 26 which is numerically missing in their analysis.

Awards
 Wehrmacht Long Service Award 4th Class
 Iron Cross (1939)
 2nd Class (1 November 1939)
 1st Class (18 November 1940)
 Honorary Cup of the Luftwaffe on 22 June 1942 as Oberleutnant and pilot
 Knight's Cross of the Iron Cross with Oak Leaves
 Knight's Cross on 30 July 1941 as Oberleutnant and Staffelkapitän of the 9./Jagdgeschwader 3
 107th Oak Leaves on 26 July 1942 as Oberleutnant and Staffelkapitän of the 9./Jagdgeschwader 3 "Udet"

Notes

References

Citations

Bibliography

 
 
 
 
 
 
 
 
 
 
 
 
 
 
 
 
 
 
 
 
 

1915 births
1969 deaths
People from Vorpommern-Greifswald
Luftwaffe pilots
German World War II flying aces
People from the Province of Pomerania
Recipients of the Knight's Cross of the Iron Cross with Oak Leaves
Reich Labour Service members
Military personnel from Mecklenburg-Western Pomerania